Native Dancer is a phrase that may also refer to:
Native Dancer, a famed race horse
Native Dancer (album), a 1974 album by Wayne Shorter
"Native Dancer" (song), a 2009 song by Japanese band Sakanaction